The Philip Meyer Journalism Award has been awarded since 2005 to recognize the best journalism done using social science research methods.

Background 
The Philip Meyer Journalism Award is a joint program of the National Institute for Computer-Assisted Reporting and Arizona State University's Walter Cronkite School of Journalism and Mass Communication. The award is named for Philip Meyer, a groundbreaking journalist and professor who has championed the use of scientific methods in the media. It is presented at the annual conference held by the National Institute for Computer-Assisted Reporting.

Thomas Hargrove, Fred Schulte and David Donald are the only reporters to have won the award twice.

Winners

Notes

References
 
 
 
 
 
 
 
 
 
 
 
 
 
 
 
 
 
 

American journalism awards
Awards established in 2005